One third of Hart District Council in Hampshire, England is elected each year, followed by one year without election. Since the last boundary changes in 2014, 33 councillors have been elected from 11 wards.

Political control
Since the first election to the council in 1973 political control of the council has been held by the following parties:

Leadership
The leaders of the council since 2008 have been:

Council elections
1973 Hartley Wintney District Council election
1976 Hart District Council election (New ward boundaries)
1979 Hart District Council election
1980 Hart District Council election
1982 Hart District Council election
1983 Hart District Council election
1984 Hart District Council election
1986 Hart District Council election
1987 Hart District Council election
1988 Hart District Council election
1990 Hart District Council election (District boundary changes took place but the number of seats remained the same)
1991 Hart District Council election (District boundary changes took place but the number of seats remained the same)
1992 Hart District Council election (District boundary changes took place but the number of seats remained the same)
1994 Hart District Council election
1995 Hart District Council election
1996 Hart District Council election
1998 Hart District Council election
1999 Hart District Council election
2000 Hart District Council election
2002 Hart District Council election (New ward boundaries)
2003 Hart District Council election
2004 Hart District Council election
2006 Hart District Council election
2007 Hart District Council election
2008 Hart District Council election
2010 Hart District Council election
2011 Hart District Council election
2012 Hart District Council election
2014 Hart District Council election (New ward boundaries)
2015 Hart District Council election
2016 Hart District Council election
2018 Hart District Council election
2019 Hart District Council election
2021 Hart District Council election

District results map

By-election results

1997-2001

2001-2005

2005-2009

2009-2013

References

By-election results

External links
Hart District Council

 
Council elections
Council elections in Hampshire
Hart